Worrilow is a surname. Notable people with the surname include:

 Paul Worrilow (born 1990), American football player
 Thomas Worrilow (1918–2004), American politician